There are several places that have the name Cedral:

 Cedral, São Paulo, Brazil
 Cedral, Maranhão, Brazil
 Cedral, San Luis Potosí, Mexico